Alternative Gifts may refer to:
 Alternative giving, in which the giver donates to charity on the recipient's behalf
 Alternative Gifts International, a company specialized in alternative gifts